Nazarabad-e Olya (also Romanized as Naz̧arābād-e ‘Olyā; also known as Naz̧arābād-e Bālā) is a village in Baladarband Rural District, in the Central District of Kermanshah County, Kermanshah Province, Iran. At the 2006 census, its population was 39, in 10 families.

References 

Populated places in Kermanshah County